Girls Can Tell is the third studio album by American indie rock band Spoon. Intended as a stylistic departure from the band's previous work, Girls Can Tell features classic rock and new wave influences absent on their major label albums.

The album was released on Merge Records on February 20, 2001. Spoon frontman Britt Daniel described the album as "a turning point stylistically, and it was a turning point in terms of us being able to put out a record and not feeling like as soon as it came out the wheels fell off the cart."

Girls Can Tell, up to December 2009, has sold slightly fewer than 100,000 copies, according to Nielsen SoundScan.

Background
After the band was dropped from their major record deal with Elektra in August 1998, Spoon finished the first version of Girls Can Tell in May 1999 with ten songs. Spoon frontman Britt Daniel moved to New York for a change of pace from Austin and to work temp jobs while drummer Jim Eno, stayed in Austin, designing semiconductor chips. Despite Daniel thinking the album was the band's best, the band's lawyer and manager reported no interest in the record week after week, a personal low point for Daniel. He later described the record as the band's hardest to record, given the emotional toll of his indigence, lack of external interest in the record, and the length of time it took to create. Daniel thought this emotional vulnerability came across in the record. The only interest came from Mike McCarthy, who would come to produce the record's second incarnation, and Matador Records's Gerard Cosloy. The second version reworked "Anything You Want" and "Take a Walk", removed the band's spurned songs about their Elektra A&R rep, and added "Everything Hits at Once", "Believing Is Art", and "10:20 AM".

After writing more songs, Daniel and producer Mike McCarthy returned to Austin and began working on a new album in Eno's garage studio. The band eventually signed with Merge to release the new album, entitled Girls Can Tell.

According to Daniel, Girls Can Tell was intended to be a departure from the band's established style: "The big idea behind Girls Can Tell was to take stock of the band's MO from inception until that point, to carefully consider all the things we'd been trying to do and the way we'd been doing them, and then set out to specifically avoid all of that." He cited the Kinks, the Supremes, and Elvis Costello as inspirations for the album; specifically, Costello's Get Happy!! album, which he had borrowed from his then-girlfriend Eleanor Friedberger.

Daniel saw the album as a last-ditch attempt to find success. He explained:

The track "Me and the Bean" is a cover of a mid-1990s Austin, Texas band called The Sidehackers. The songwriter of The Sidehackers, John Clayton, played bass on Spoon's subsequent album, Kill the Moonlight.

Reception

Girls Can Tell saw significant critical acclaim and was heralded for its change in style from the band's previous work. Pitchfork's Nick Mirov said of the album "It's a great thing, hearing a band grow up without losing sight of what made them so vital in the first place; and seeing as how Girls Can Tell might not have ever seen the light of day, it makes it even better. It's worth cherishing."

The A.V. Club commented, "Few outside the band would deny the irony of releasing such a strong album after such an unceremonious major-label dumping." Stereogums Tom Breihan, on the album's twentieth anniversary, noted, "The album hasn't lost any of that simple but hard-to-describe coolness."

Pitchfork placed Girls Can Tell at number 96 on its list of top 200 albums of the 2000s (decade).

Track listing

Personnel
Spoon
Britt Daniel – guitar, voice, keyboards
Joshua Zarbo – bass
Jim Eno – drums

Additional musicians
Conrad Keely – Mellotron on tracks 1 and 8
Laura Phelan – vibraphone on tracks 1 and 10
Lee Spencer – harpsichord on track 5
Ames Asbell – viola on track 10

Charts

References

2001 albums
Spoon (band) albums
Merge Records albums